Rudolf Lothar [rú:dolf ló:tar] (born Rudolf Lothar Spitzer; 25 February 1865 – 2 October 1943) was a Hungarian-born Austrian writer, playwright, critic and essayist. He was born and died in Budapest.

Literary works 
 1891 Der verschleierte König, drama
 1900 König Harlekin, play
 1900 Das Wiener Burgtheater
 1904 Tiefland, opera libretto set to music by Eugen d'Albert, based on the 1896 Catalan play Terra baixa by Àngel Guimerà
 1910 Kurfürstendamm, novel
 1910 Die drei Grazien, comedy
 1910 Der Herr von Berlin, novel
 1912 Liebesketten, opera libretto set to music by Eugen d'Albert based on Angel Guimerá’s Villa del mar, score available from Sibley Music Library Digital Scores Collection
 1916 Die Seele Spaniens
 1920 Casanovas Sohn, comedy
 1920 Li-Tai-Pe, Des Kaisers Dichter, opera libretto set to music by Clemens von Franckenstein
 1921 Der Werwolf, comedy
 1925 Die Kunst des Verführens
 1927 Der gute Europäer, comedy
 1927 Die Republik befiehlt, comedy
 1931 Friedemann Bach, opera libretto set to music by Paul Graener based on Albert Emil Brachvogel's novel of the same name
 1931 Der Papagei, comedy
 1931 Besuch aus dem Jenseits, drama
 1934 The Red Cat (German title: Die Nacht vor dem Ultimo), comedy

Filmography
Under the Mountains, directed by Béla Balogh (Silent film, 1920, based on the opera Tiefland)
Lowlands, directed by Adolf E. Licho (Silent film, 1922, based on the opera Tiefland)
The Masked Dancer, directed by Burton L. King (Silent film, 1924, based on the play Die Frau mit der Maske)
For Wives Only, directed by Victor Heerman (Silent film, 1926, based on the story The Critical Year)
The Magic Flame, directed by Henry King (Silent film, 1927, based on the play König Harlekin)
The Boudoir Diplomat, directed by Malcolm St. Clair (English, 1930, based on the play Die Republik befiehlt)
Don Juan diplomático, directed by George Melford (Spanish, 1931, based on the play Die Republik befiehlt)
Boudoir diplomatique, directed by Marcel De Sano (French, 1931, based on the play Die Republik befiehlt)
Liebe auf Befehl, directed by Johannes Riemann and Ernst L. Frank (German, 1931, based on the play Die Republik befiehlt)
Folies Bergère de Paris, directed by Roy Del Ruth (English, 1935, based on the play Die Nacht vor dem Ultimo)
Folies-Bergère, directed by Roy Del Ruth and Marcel Achard (French, 1935, based on the play Die Nacht vor dem Ultimo)
Return of a Stranger, directed by Victor Hanbury (English, 1937, based on a play)
That Night in Rio, directed by Irving Cummings (English, 1941, based on the play Die Nacht vor dem Ultimo)
Esta é Fina, directed by Luiz de Barros (Portuguese, 1948, based on the play Die Nacht vor dem Ultimo)
On the Riviera, directed by Walter Lang (English, 1951, based on the play Die Nacht vor dem Ultimo)
Tiefland, directed by Leni Riefenstahl (German, 1940–54, based on the opera Tiefland)

References 
 Article in Österreichisches Biographisches Lexikon 1815–1950

External links
 

19th-century Hungarian male writers
20th-century Hungarian male writers
Austrian male dramatists and playwrights
Hungarian male dramatists and playwrights
19th-century Austrian male writers
20th-century Austrian male writers
1865 births
Austrian critics
1943 deaths
19th-century Hungarian dramatists and playwrights
20th-century Hungarian dramatists and playwrights
19th-century Austrian dramatists and playwrights
20th-century Austrian dramatists and playwrights
Theatre people from Budapest